Yelena Lapuga (born 17 May 1964) is a Soviet speed skater. She competed at the 1988 Winter Olympics and the 1992 Winter Olympics.

References

1964 births
Living people
Kazakhstani female speed skaters
Soviet female speed skaters
Olympic speed skaters of the Soviet Union
Olympic speed skaters of the Unified Team
Speed skaters at the 1988 Winter Olympics
Speed skaters at the 1992 Winter Olympics
People from Pavlodar